Balıkesir University is a public university in Balıkesir, Turkey. It was established in 1992.

History
The roots of Balikesir University date back to Karesi Teacher Training School, which was established in 1910. Balikesir State Engineering Academy, Balikesir Management and Tourism Vocational School and Balikesir Vocational School started educational facilities in 1975-1976 and this marked an important step for the establishment of the university. These establishments changed their names and status and they were made to continue their educational facilities under the name of Uludag University in 1982 with the decree law numbered 41. Necati Education Institute became a four-year “High Teacher Training School” in 1981 and then in 1982, this institution was renamed Necatibey Education Faculty.

In the same way, the name of Balikesir Business Administration and Hotel Management Vocational School was changed as Balikesir School of Tourism and Hotel Management and the name of two–year Balikesir Vocational School remained the same. These institutions, which operated under the name of Uludağ University for ten years, have established a firm infrastructure for Balikesir University through a healthy and stable development. Balikesir University was established in accordance with the law dated 11 June 1992, numbered 3837 published in official journal numbered 21281. Since January 1, 1993, Balikesir University has maintained its activities.

After the legal establishment of Bandırma Onyedi Eylül University in 2015, the Faculties of Economics and Administrative Sciences, Maritime Studies, Health Sciences in Bandırma, the Gönen Geothermic Institute and the vocational schools in Bandırma, Erdek, Manyas and Gönen were transferred from Balıkesir University to the Bandırma 17 Eylül University.

Campuses

Çağış Campus
The units listed below are on the main Çağış Campus on the outskirts of the city. Buses and minibuses provide regular services to Çağış Campus from the city center between the hours 07:00 and 23:00.

 Rectorate building, with administrative departments
 Faculty of Engineering and Architecture
 Faculty of Sciences and Arts
 School of Tourism and Hotel Management
 Balıkesir Vocational School
 Central Library
 Main Sports Hall
 Graduate School of Science
 Graduate School of Social Sciences

NEF Campus
NEF Campus, in the center of the town, was the original site of the university. These units are on this campus:
 Education Faculty
 School of Physical Education and Sports Teaching
 NEF Conference Hall
 Halil İnalcık Conference Hall
 Sports Hall
 University Fitness Center
 Outdoor sports facilities
 Continuing Education Center (BAUSEM)

Faculties
Faculty of Engineering and Architecture	
Necatibey Education Faculty	
Faculty of Medicine	
Faculty of Science and Literature	
Faculty of Fine Arts	
Balikesir Faculty of Economics and Administrative Sciences

Vocational Schools
Ayvalık Vocational School	
Havran Vocational School		
Burhaniye Vocational School	
Balıkesir Vocational School	
Sındırgı Vocational School	
Bigadiç Vocational School	
Dursunbey Vocational School	
Susurluk Vocational School	
Savaştepe Vocational School	
Edremit Vocational School	
Altınoluk Mes.Y.O.

Rectors
 1992-1994: Prof. Dr. Asım Yücel
 1994-1998: Prof. Dr. Aydın Okcu
 1998-2002: Prof. Dr. Necdet Hacıoğlu
 2002-06: Prof. Dr. Necdet Hacıoğlu
 2006-10: Prof. Dr. Şerif Saylan
 2010-14: Prof. Dr. Mahir Alkan
 2014-18: Prof. Dr. Kerim Özdemir
 2018-present: Prof. Dr. İlter Kuş

Notable alumni
Yasemin Adar, Turkish female freestyle wrestler
Tuna Aktürk, ex Vice-Mayor of Balıkesir Mayority and Balıkesirspor President
Halil İnalcık, Historian of Ottoman Empire
Muharrem İnce, Member of Turkish Parliament
Gülşah Kocatürk, Turkish female judoka
İsmail Özgün, Turkish politician
Ümit Sonkol, Türk Telekom B.K. basketball player

References 

 Balıkesir University

External links 
 Balıkesir University(In Turkish) Balıkesir University 

 
Balıkesir Province
Buildings and structures in Balıkesir Province
Educational institutions established in 1910
1992 establishments in Turkey
Educational institutions established in 1992
Education in Balıkesir